Carlisle Public School may refer to:

Carlisle Public Schools (Arkansas)
Carlisle Public Schools (Massachusetts)